The Journal of Neuropsychology is a biannual peer-reviewed scientific journal covering clinical and research studies across neurology, psychology and psychiatry. It is published by The British Psychological Society. The editors-in-chief is Martin Gareth Edwards (Université catholique de Louvain).

It is abstracted and indexed by Academic Search Alumni Edition, Academic Search Complete, PubMed, PsycINFO, Science Citation Index Expanded, SCOPUS, Social Sciences Citation Index, and Web of Science.

In 2018, it had a Social Sciences Citation Index impact factor of 2.468.

References

External links
Journal of Neuropsychology

Biannual journals
English-language journals
Neuropsychology journals
British Psychological Society academic journals